Long Branch is a light rail station that is currently under construction in the Long Branch neighborhood of Silver Spring, Maryland. It will be part of the Purple Line in Maryland. The station will be located at Arliss Street and Piney Branch Road, adjacent to the Long Branch Library.

History 
The Purple Line system is under construction as of 2022 and is scheduled to open in 2026.

Station layout
The station consists of an island platform on the south side of Arliss Street, just west of Piney Branch Road.

References

Purple Line (Maryland)
Railway stations scheduled to open in 2026
Railway stations in Montgomery County, Maryland
Silver Spring, Maryland (CDP)